Hamin Milligan (born September 30, 1978, in St. Croix, U.S. Virgin Islands) is a former Arena Football League defensive specialist. He is the older brother of former National Football League safety Hanik Milligan.

High school years
Milligan attended Coconut Creek High School in Coconut Creek, Florida, and starred in football.

College years
Milligan attended Garden City Community College, winning NJCAA All-American honors as a freshman. As a sophomore, he was voted the team captain and the conference's top defensive back. After two years at Garden City, he transferred to the University of Houston.

Professional career
Hamin Milligan played for 5 different teams in the Arena Football League: the San Jose SaberCats (2003), the Arizona Rattlers (2003–2004), the Chicago Rush (2004), the Dallas Desperados (2005–2006), and the Georgia Force (2007–2008).

External links
AFL stats
Georgia Force's player page

1978 births
Living people
United States Virgin Islands players of American football
American football defensive backs
Houston Cougars football players
San Jose SaberCats players
Arizona Rattlers players
Chicago Rush players
Dallas Desperados players
Georgia Force players
People from Saint Croix, U.S. Virgin Islands